George Shepley may refer to:

 George Foster Shepley (judge) (1819–1878), American Civil War general
 George Foster Shepley (architect) (1860–1903), American architect
 George Leander Shepley (1854–1924), Lieutenant Governor of Rhode Island